Cadwallader may refer to:

Cadwallader (name), a surname and given name; the article list of people with this name
Cadwaladr (name), the standard Welsh form of this name; the article lists other variant spellings
Cadwalader (disambiguation), a further variant form of the name

Places
Cadwallader Range, a mountain range in British Columbia, Canada
Cadwallader Creek, British Columbia, Canada
Cadwallader, a former name of West Chester, Ohio

Other
 Algernon Cadwallader, an American emo band